The Danish Cultural Institute promotes cultural exchanges between Denmark and the rest of the world. It supports projects aimed at long-term cooperation between foreign and Danish cultural institutions, artists and other professionals. The current Secretary General is Camilla Mordhorst.

History
The Danish Cultural Institute began in 1940, when Folmer Wisti established the Danish Society. The aim of the Society was to promote international understanding through information about Denmark and to further the exchange of culture, ideas and experience between Denmark and other countries. Its name was changed to the Danish Cultural Institute in 1989.

Since its foundation, the Danish Cultural Institute has put a lot of effort into its local representation in foreign countries. The first foreign branch offices were established in 1947. These offices are often situated outside the capital city.

Offices
The Danish Cultural Institute's head office is in Copenhagen, Denmark. The number and location of offices has varied over the years. Earlier there were institutes in France, Germany, the United Kingdom, the United States, the Netherlands, northern Italy, Hungary, Estonia, Lithuania and Austria. Today, branch offices can be found in:

 Benelux, Brussels
 Brazil, Rio de Janeiro
 China, Beijing
 Latvia, Riga
 Poland, Warsaw
 Russia, St Petersburg
 India, New Delhi

References

External links
The Danish Cultural Institute

Cultural promotion organizations
Cultural organizations based in Denmark
Organizations established in 1940